Jeffrey Thue (born January 25, 1969 in Regina, Saskatchewan) is a Canadian wrestler. He won a silver medal in the Men's Freestyle Super Heavyweight (+130 kg) category at the 1992 Summer Olympics.

He was made a member of the Saskatchewan Sports (1997), Canadian Amateur Wrestling Association (2003), and Simon Fraser University (2012) Halls of Fame.

External links
 Athlete Biography at Canadian Olympic Committee
 Induction at Saskatchewan Sports Hall of Fame
 Induction at Simon Fraser University Hall of Fame

1969 births
Sportspeople from Regina, Saskatchewan
Olympic wrestlers of Canada
Olympic silver medalists for Canada
Wrestlers at the 1992 Summer Olympics
Canadian male sport wrestlers
Living people
Olympic medalists in wrestling
Medalists at the 1992 Summer Olympics
20th-century Canadian people